Jean-Baptiste Maille is a French professional basketball player for SIG Strasbourg of the French LNB Pro A.

Professional career
During the 2017–18 Pro A season, Jean-Baptiste Maille played for the league competitor Limoges CSP. 

He was part of the SIG Strasbourg team that finished fourth at the 2020–21 Basketball Champions League.

Personal
As a child, Maille admired Shawnta Rogers and Sandro Nicevic.

References

External links
Basketball Champions League profile
Profile at Eurobasket.com
ScoutBasketball profile

1993 births
Living people
French men's basketball players
Guards (basketball)
SIG Basket players
Sportspeople from Le Mans